Clint Ingram (born March 21, 1983) is a  former American football linebacker. He spent six seasons in the National Football League from 2006 to 2011, playing for the Jacksonville Jaguars and New Orleans Saints. He played college football for the University of Oklahoma Sooners, and was drafted into the NFL by Jacksonville in the third round of the 2006 NFL Draft.

Early life
Ingram was born in Hallsville, Texas, and is the nephew of NFL runningback Robert Newhouse. Ingram attended the University of Oklahoma, where he played for the Oklahoma Sooners football team. At the end of the 2005 Holiday Bowl in San Diego, Ingram intercepted a pass from University of Oregon reserve quarterback Brady Leaf in the final seconds of the game, virtually sealing victory in the game for the Sooners.

Professional career
Ingram was picked by the Jacksonville Jaguars in the third round of the 2006 NFL Draft. His draft preparation with IMG was chronicled in the film Two Days in April. He played with Jacksonville until 2009, when he was released.

On May 19, 2010, the New Orleans Saints announced that they had signed him to a one-year contract. Ingram was recovering from a prior knee injury when he signed, and was designated as Physically Unable to Perform. His recovery did not proceed as quickly as expected, he was unable to practice with the team during training camp or the regular season, and the Saints eventually released him on October 20, 2010.

Ingram was selected by the Virginia Destroyers in the 4th round of the 2011 UFL draft.

On August 1, 2011, Ingram re-signed with New Orleans.

NFL combine

References

External links
 databaseFootball.com

1983 births
Living people
People from Hallsville, Texas
American football outside linebackers
Oklahoma Sooners football players
Jacksonville Jaguars players
New Orleans Saints players